Christophe Copel (born 20 August 1986) is a French former professional footballer who played as a striker.

Rising through the Olympique Marseille alongside players such as Cédric Carrasso, Seydou Keita, Mathieu Flamini, Samir Nasri and Mehdi Benatia, Copel would play his entire professional career in Belgium.

References

External links
 Footgoal Profile

1986 births
Living people
French footballers
Footballers from Marseille
F.C.V. Dender E.H. players
SO Cassis Carnoux players
K.V.K. Tienen-Hageland players
K.R.C. Mechelen players
Association football forwards
Francs Borains players
French expatriate footballers
Expatriate footballers in Belgium
French expatriate sportspeople in Belgium